Beryl Swain (née Beryl J Tolman, 22 January 1936 – 15 May 2007) was a female road racer of solo motorcycles from the London area. In 1962, she was the first woman to compete in a TT race for solo motorcycles on the Isle of Man TT course.

Early life 
Beryl Tolman was born on 22 January 1936 and brought up in Walthamstow, in North East London. She worked as a senior secretary at P&O in the City until she married Edwin Swain, a motorcycle shop owner, in 1958.

Racing motorcycles 
She was noted for being the first woman to compete in a TT race for solo motorcycles on the Isle of Man TT course, a rare occurrence to this day on one of the world's most famous races held on closed public roads. This 1962 upset led the male-dominated world of motorcycle racing to revoke her international licence via the introduction of a minimum weight limit which she could not meet, due to the perception of the sport being too dangerous for women, and the resulting ban on female entrants persisted until Hilary Musson competed in 1978.

Swain finished 22nd on a 50 cc race-prepared Itom after two laps of the Mountain circuit in the 1962 Race. Her average speed was 48.3mph after her bike lost top gear on the second lap. This was the first time a 50cc event had been included in the Island's programme as from 1962 the class carried World Championship points.

Motorcycle Grand Prix results

(key) (Races in italics indicate fastest lap)

Later life 
After her racing career was cut short, Swain, who was previously an office worker, embarked on a retail management career with Sainsbury's grocery supermarkets around the London area. She retired to Woodford, Essex, and later Epping, becoming secretary to WI local branches of the Women's Institute and helping organise meals on wheels for the elderly. Laterly she suffered from Alzheimer's disease, and died on May 15, 2007, aged 71.

Commemoration 
A blue plaque was erected in Beryl Swain's honour at her former home at 18 Grosvenor Park Road, Walthamstow, London E17 9PA by Waltham Forest Council as part of the local Waltham Forest Heritage scheme on 31 May 2019.

Sources

External links
Girl Racer - Beryl Swain at British Pathé
Times Obituary - Swain, Beryl (non-public access, transcript of content can be found here)
History of women in the TT

1936 births
2007 deaths
People from Walthamstow
English sportswomen
English motorcycle racers
Isle of Man TT riders
Female motorcycle racers

British motorcycle racers